Ullal Beach  is situated on the southwestern seaboard of the Indian sub-continent, adjacent to Ullal town, 10 km south of the city of Mangalore, Karnataka, India.  Attractions are its picturesque stretch of Coconut trees, fishermen's lane, the ruined fort of Abbakka Devi and 16th century Jain temples.  A resort is also situated nearby.

The Dargah of Sayed Mohammed Shereful Madani, who is said to have come to Ullal from Madina 400 years ago, is a famous dargah located nearby.

Accessibility 
Ullal Beach is well connected by public transport. Ullal Bus Station can be reached from Thokkottu on the National Highway 66, provides convenient access to the beach. There are many city buses from statebank, Kankanady, Deralakatte and other parts of Mangalore city. The beach is very close to Ullal bus station and accessible by walk.

Distance from other major destinations:
Pumpwell, Mangalore - 10 km
Mudipu Infosys, Mangalore - 14 km
New Mangalore Port, Mangalore- 19 km
Pilikula Nisargadhama, Mangalore - 20 km
Tannirbhavi Beach, Mangalore- 22 km
Panambur Beach,  Mangalore - 23 km
National Institute of Technology Karnataka, Surathkal, Mangalore - 28 km
Kasargod, Kerala - 40 km
Manipal - 77 km
Dharmasthala - 78 km
Kukke Subramanya Temple - 106 km
Kannur, Kerala - 130 km
Mysore - 255 km
Bangalore - 375 km

Nearest Railway Stations:
Ullal railway station, Ullal, Mangalore - 3 km
Mangalore Central railway station, Hampankatta, Mangalore - 10 km
Mangalore Junction railway station, Padil, Mangalore - 11 km
Surathkal railway station, Surathkal, Mangalore - 26 km

Nearest Airport:
 Mangalore International Airport (India) - 22 km

Climate 
Mangalore has a tropical monsoon climate and is under the direct influence of the Arabian Sea branch of the southwest monsoon.

See also 
 Ullal
 NITK Beach
 Panambur Beach
 Tannirbhavi Beach
 Sasihithlu Beach
 Someshwar Beach
 Pilikula Nisargadhama
 Kadri Park
 Tagore Park
 St. Aloysius Chapel
 Bejai Museum
 Aloyseum
 Kudla Kudru

References 

Beaches of Mangalore